Ten Mile Lake Provincial Park is a provincial park in the Cariboo Land District of British Columbia, Canada, ten miles (16 km) north of the city of Quesnel. The park is situated within the Fraser Plateau and Basin complex, in a transition area between the wetter Quesnel Highland to the east, and the dry Chilcotin Plateau to the west.

Ten Mile Lake Provincial Park is named after a Pacific Great Eastern Railway milepost placed in the area in the early 1900s.

References

Geography of the Cariboo
Provincial parks of British Columbia